Husamul Haramain (Ḥusām al-Haramayn) or Husam al Harmain (The Sword of the Two Holy Mosques) 1906, is a treatise written by Ahmad Raza Khan (1856- 1921) which declared the founders of the Deobandi, Ahle Hadith and Ahmadiyya movements as heretics.

The treatise is published in Arabic, Urdu, English, Turkish and in Hindi language and its pledge is mandatory in Al Jamiatul Ashrafia.

History
In 1905, Khan performed pilgrimage to holy sites in the Hejaz. During this period, he prepared a draft document entitled "Al Motamad Al Mustanad" (The Reliable Proofs) in which he argued against opinions of founders of Deobandi, Ahle Hadith and Ahmadiyya movement for presentation to his contemporaries in Mecca and Medina. Khan collected scholarly opinions of thirty-three fellow scholars' verdicts. All of them concurred with his assertion that the founders of Deobandi, Ahmadiyya and Ahle Hadith movements were apostate and blasphemers. They also exhorted the government of British India to execute the founders of those movements for heresy.

The fatwa deals separately regarding each of the following:

Deobandi 
The major Deobandi scholars Muhammad Qasim Nanautawi, Rashid Ahmad Gangohi and Ashraf Ali Thanwi were stated as infidels allegedly for producing blasphemous texts against Allah, Prophet Muhammad and the Awliya. Khalil Ahmed Saharanpuri then compiled a set of questions and answers and took signatures from various scholars at Darul Uloom Deoband entitled Al-Muhannad ala al-Mufannad and submitted it to scholars of Makkah and Madinah. The book consisted of agreed upon creeds of Deobandi scholars which in turn confirmed the beliefs of Barelvi muslims.

Ahmadiyya 

Mirza Ghulam Qadiyani, the founder of Ahmadi movement stated as being outside the fold of Islam due to supposed violation of the belief regarding the finality of Prophethood of Muhammad.

See also 
 List of Sunni books
 Fatawa-e-Alamgiri
 Fatawa-e-Razvia

References

Further reading
The Enemy within: Madrasa and Muslim Identity in North India by Arshad Alam, Modern Asian Studies Vol. 42, No. 2/3, Islam in South Asia (Mar. - May, 2008), pp. 605–627
Holy Quran's Judgement, Part 2 By M.S.M Abdullah 
Who is a Muslim? Identities of exclusion—north Indian Muslims, c. 1860–1900, S.A. Zaidi,Independent Scholar, Karachi
Madrasas in South Asia: Teaching Terror? edited by Jamal Malik, Professor and Chair of Religious Studies - Islamic Studies Jamal Malik
"Taqweeyat-ul Imaan" by Ismaeel Dehlwi  
"Seerate Mustaqeem" by Ismaeel Dehlwi
"Fatawa Rasheedia" by Rasheed Ahmed Gangohi

External links
Husamul Haramain in various languages

Sunni literature
Fatwas
Barelvi literature
Islamic literature
Works of Ahmed Raza Khan Barelvi
1906 non-fiction books
20th-century Indian books
Indian non-fiction books
Indian religious texts